True to Life may refer to:

True to Life (Ray Charles album), 1977
 True to Life (film), a 1943 film directed by George Marshall
 "True to Life", a song by Roxy Music on the 1982 album Avalon
True to Life (Lisette Melendez album), 1994